Adrian Jeremy Dickey (born October 23, 1973) is an American politician and a senator for the state of Iowa for District 44.

Personal life
Dickey, the son of former longtime Packwood mayor Dave Dickey, was born in Packwood, Iowa in 1973. He resides there with his family.

In 2022, a TikTok user published videos saying she had cut ties with her father, a "Republican state senator", for advocating the Iowa Supreme Court to overturn abortion rights in the Planned Parenthood v. Reynolds (2022) decision, and for voting to pass House File 2416, which banned trans women and girls from female sports. According to the poster, she is Adrian Dickey's daughter, Korynn.

Political career
With Dave Loebsack's retirement, Mariannette Miller-Meeks resigned from her Iowa Senate, District 41 seat to fill the vacancy for Iowa's 2nd congressional district. A special election was called for by Iowa governor Kim Reynolds to fill the vacancy left by Miller-Meeks. Republican Packwood native Adrian Dickey defeated Democratic challenger Mary Stewart to win the vacant Iowa senate seat in January 2021.

Electoral history

2021

2022

References

External links
Adrian Dickey @Ballotpedia

|-

1973 births
Living people
People from Iowa
People from Jefferson County, Iowa
Republican Party Iowa state senators
21st-century American politicians